Gotley Glacier is a well-defined glacier,  long, descending from the ice-covered slopes of the Big Ben massif to the southwest side of Heard Island in the southern Indian Ocean. Its terminus is located between Cape Arkona and Cape Labuan. To the east of Gotley Glacier is Deacock Glacier, whose terminus is located between Cape Labuan and Long Beach. To the northwest of Gotley Glacier is Lied Glacier, whose terminus is located between Cape Arkona and Cape Pillar. Cape Arkona separates Gotley Glacier from Lied Glacier.

Discovery and naming
Gotley Glacier was surveyed in 1948 by the Australian National Antarctic Research Expeditions, and named by them for Aubrey V. Gotley, meteorologist and officer-in-charge of the party.

References

Further reading

External links
Click here  to see a map of Heard Island and McDonald Islands, including all major topographical features
Australian Antarctic Division
Australian Antarctic Gazetteer
Composite Gazetteer of Antarctica
Australian Antarctic Names and Medals Committee (AANMC)
United States Geological Survey, Geographic Names Information System (GNIS)
Scientific Committee on Antarctic Research (SCAR)

Glaciers of Heard Island and McDonald Islands